The 2012 Oldham Council election took place on 3 May 2012 to elect members of Oldham Metropolitan Borough Council in the North West, England. This was on the same day as other 2012 United Kingdom local elections.

Labour retained control of the council.

After the election, the composition of the council was

Labour 44
Liberal Democrat 14
Conservative 2

Election result

Ward results

Alexandra ward

Alexandra ward by-election 2013 
A by-election was held on Thursday, 9 May 2013 in the Alexandra ward of Oldham. The seat became vacant following the death of Dilys Fletcher in February. The results were as follows:

Chadderton Central ward

Chadderton North ward

Chadderton South ward

Coldhurst ward

Crompton ward

Failsworth East ward

Failsworth West ward

Hollinwood ward

Medlock Vale ward

Royton North ward

Royton South ward

Saddleworth North ward

Saddleworth South ward

Saddleworth West & Lees ward

Shaw ward

St. James ward

St. Mary's ward

Waterhead ward

Werneth ward

References

2012 English local elections
2012
2010s in Greater Manchester